Carlos Brillembourg is an architect based in New York City. He is the owner of Carlos Brillembourg Architects, a firm that he founded in 1984.

Brillembourg was an author and the editor of Latin American Architecture 1929–1960: Contemporary Reflections, which was published in 2004. He has been the contributing editor for architecture for Bomb magazine since 1992.

Early life and education 
Brillembourg was born in Caracas, and his family moved to Long Island when he was 8. He received his Master's in architecture from Columbia University in 1975.

Career

Early jobs
After graduating, Brillembourg worked at W.J. Alcock, an architecture firm in Caracas and later at Mitchell/Giurgola in New York. In 1980, he founded his own practice, Brillembourg Arquitectos y Urbanistas in Caracas. Later, he established an office in New York and maintained two offices until 1998.

Brillembourg was a founding member of the Instituto de Arquitectura Urbana (IAU) in Caracas (1977). As the director of this organization, he led a team of twenty architects that produced urban design solutions for the city of Caracas and other cities such as Ciudad Guyana. Parallel to his practice, he has taught at the Simon Bolivar University in Caracas, the Institute for Architecture and Urban Studies, in New York, and Columbia University's Graduate School of Architecture, Planning and Preservation.

Recent positions and awards
Brillembourg received The Biennial of Architecture Award in Venezuela for a single-family residence (Palmasola). His proposal for a New World Center was exhibited in the American pavilion of the Architecture Biennial in Venice 2002.

Brillembourg was an author and the editor of Latin American Architecture 1929–1960: Contemporary Reflections, which was published in 2004. He has been the contributing editor for Architecture for Bomb magazine since 1992.

Personal life 
Brillembourg is married to Karin Waisman, an artist. Their house in Southampton, which they designed, has been featured in multiple publications.

Awards and honors 
2013 – Fellow of the American Institute of Architects

Notable projects 
Sportscenter Interalumina 1982–84
World Arts Center 2002 
Hildreth House 2007
Sagaponak 1983–2010

Bibliography 
Latin American Architecture 1929–1960: Contemporary Reflections (2004)
Caracas: Towards A New City 1938–1958
Unbuilt. Raimund Abraham (2011)
Beyond The Supersquare (2013)

See also
List of Venezuelan Americans

References

External links

Living people
Venezuelan architects
American people of Venezuelan descent
Columbia Graduate School of Architecture, Planning and Preservation alumni
Year of birth missing (living people)